The 2004 Argentine Professional Golf Tour was a season of golf tournaments on the Argentine Professional Golf Tour (TAPG), the then official professional golf tour of Argentina. The season ran from the end of January to the beginning of December, and consisted of 13 tournaments.

The Order of Merit was won by José Cóceres, ahead of Ángel Cabrera in second, and Rafael Echenique in third.

One event, the South Open, was co-sanctioned by the Tour de las Americas, the highest level tour in Latin America.

Schedule of tournaments

External links
http://www.pgargentina.org.ar – official site

Golf in Argentina
Argentine Professional Golf Tour